M-E Girard is a Canadian writer whose debut young adult novel Girl Mans Up was published in 2016.

The novel won the Lambda Literary Award for LGBT Children's and Young Adult Literature at the 29th Lambda Literary Awards in 2017. The book was also a shortlisted finalist for the American Library Association's William C. Morris Award and the Kobo Emerging Writer Prize in 2017.

References

External links

21st-century Canadian novelists
Canadian women novelists
Canadian writers of young adult literature
Canadian LGBT novelists
Queer writers
Writers from Ontario
Living people
Lambda Literary Award for Children's and Young Adult Literature winners
21st-century Canadian women writers
Year of birth missing (living people)
21st-century Canadian LGBT people